Jean Marie Chaumelin known as Marius Chaumelin (born 15 April 1833 in Paray-le-Monial, died 20 October 1889 in Paris) was a French art critic, journalist and writer. He was director of customs for Caen (1881) and then in Paris (1884). He was knighted in the Légion d'honneur on December 20, 1884.

References

1833 births
1889 deaths
French art critics
Recipients of the Legion of Honour
19th-century French journalists
People from Paray-le-Monial